HMCS Dauphin was a  that served in the Royal Canadian Navy during the Second World War. She served primarily as a convoy escort in the Battle of the Atlantic. She was named for Dauphin, Manitoba.

Background

Flower-class corvettes like Dauphin serving with the Royal Canadian Navy during the Second World War were different from earlier and more traditional sail-driven corvettes. The "corvette" designation was created by the French as a class of small warships; the Royal Navy borrowed the term for a period but discontinued its use in 1877. During the hurried preparations for war in the late 1930s, Winston Churchill reactivated the corvette class, needing a name for smaller ships used in an escort capacity, in this case based on a whaling ship design. The generic name "flower" was used to designate the class of these ships, which – in the Royal Navy – were named after flowering plants.

Corvettes commissioned by the Royal Canadian Navy during the Second World War were named after communities for the most part, to better represent the people who took part in building them. This idea was put forth by Admiral Percy W. Nelles. Sponsors were commonly associated with the community for which the ship was named. Royal Navy corvettes were designed as open sea escorts, while Canadian corvettes were developed for coastal auxiliary roles which was exemplified by their minesweeping gear. Eventually the Canadian corvettes would be modified to allow them to perform better on the open seas.

Construction
Dauphin was ordered 20 January 1940 as part of the 1939-1940 Flower-class shipbuilding program. She was laid down 6 July 1940 by Canadian Vickers Ltd. at Montreal, Quebec and launched on 24 October later that year. She was commissioned on 17 May 1941 at Montreal. From April to September 1943, Dauphin was refitted at Pictou. During this time her fo'c'sle was extended. In August 1944 she underwent another refit at Liverpool, Nova Scotia.

Wartime service
In late June 1941 Dauphin joined Sydney Force. In September of that year she transferred to Newfoundland Command. However she was sent for further workups at Tobermory and returned to service as an ocean escort in mid-October.

From October 1941 to August 1944 she was an ocean escort. After December 1942 she was assigned to escort group EG A-3, which was re-designated C-5 in June 1943. Dauphin was involved in three major convoy battles during that time; SC 100 in September 1942, ON 166 in February 1943 and SC 121 in March 1943.

U-boats repeatedly attacked SC 121 from 6 to 10 March. On the night of 9–10 March  torpedoed the tramp steamers , which sank, and Colmore, which was damaged and abandoned. Dauphin tried to reach a lifeboat containing 37 men from the two ships. She got within 250 yards of the boat when her steering gear failed, forcing her to stop. It took Dauphin four hours to repair her steering gear and return to the boat. By then it had capsized and she rescued only three survivors who were clinging to the keel.

Daulhin was removed from convoy duty from April to September 1943 for a refit. In January 1945 she was reassigned to the Western Local Escort Force escort group W-7. She remained with the group until the end of the war.

Trans-Atlantic convoys escorted

Post-war service
Following the end of hostilities, Dauphin was paid off on 20 June 1945 at Sorel, Quebec. She was sold for conversion to a merchant ship and in 1949 entered service as Cortes under a Honduran flag. In 1955 she was renamed San Antonio and was registered under an Ecuadorean flag. The ship was deleted in 1992.

References

Ships of the Royal Canadian Navy
Flower-class corvettes of the Royal Canadian Navy
1940 ships